Tremithousa Chrysochous is an abandoned village in the Paphos District of Cyprus, located 6 km southwest of Lysos and about 11 kilometers southeast of Polis Chrysochous.

A stone's throw from Lake Evretou lies the now abandoned Turkish Cypriot settlement of Tremithousa Chrysochous, which is adjacent to the village of Philousa.

References

Communities in Paphos District